The 1914–15 Connecticut Aggies men's basketball team represented Connecticut Agricultural College, now the University of Connecticut, in the 1914–15 collegiate men's basketball season. The Aggies completed the season with a 1–4 overall record, after a year without competition from 1913–14. The Aggies were members of the Athletic League of New England State Colleges, where they ended the season with a 0–1 record. The Aggies played their home games at Hawley Armory in Storrs, Connecticut for the first time this season.

Schedule 

|-
!colspan=12 style=""| Regular Season

Schedule Source:

References 

UConn Huskies men's basketball seasons
Connecticut
1914 in sports in Connecticut
1915 in sports in Connecticut